Felipe de Jesús Sifuentes Muñoz (born February 16, 1994, in Monterrey, Nuevo León) is a Mexican professional footballer who last played for Real Zamora.

Honours
Mexico U17
FIFA U-17 World Cup: 2011

External links

References

Living people
1994 births
Association football midfielders
Lobos BUAP footballers
C.F. Monterrey players
C.F. Mérida footballers
Inter Playa del Carmen players
Liga MX players
Ascenso MX players
Liga Premier de México players
Footballers from Nuevo León
Sportspeople from Monterrey
Mexican footballers